Maynard Leon Wallace (April 21, 1943 – January 17, 2021) was an American politician who served in the Missouri House of Representatives from the 143rd district from 2003 to 2011.

Wallace was born in Pondfork, Missouri, and was a high school basketball coach. He served as superintendent of schools in Ava, Missouri and Forsyth, Missouri. Wallace also served on the Missouri State Board of Education. He died on January 17, 2021, in Thornfield, Missouri, at age 77.

References

1943 births
2021 deaths
People from Ozark County, Missouri
Educators from Missouri
Republican Party members of the Missouri House of Representatives